KRKY-FM is a noncommercial radio station on 88.7 FM in Douglas, Wyoming. The station is owned by Vic Michael's Cedar Cove Broadcasting and is known as K-Rocky with a variety format.

KRKY-FM is frequently heard on noncommercial and other stations owned by Michael and also has five dependent translators, also owned by Michael.

History
In 2008, the Federal Communications Commission granted Wren Communications a construction permit for a station on 88.7 MHz in Douglas. KKWY went on the air in 2011 and then went silent in October, citing the unreliability of its Internet programming feed. After emerging in June 2012, the main transmitter failed that August, leaving the station dark again for 11 months. In July 2013, the station returned to the air as KKAW.

In January 2014, KKAW asked to go silent yet again for another main transmitter failure. While silent, the station reverted to the KKWY call letters in February. Wren sold the station to Cedar Cove for $2,000. KKWY returned to the air in January 2015 and became KRKY-FM in December, the fourth station in 2015 alone to hold the call letters (the other three are now KVXO and the defunct KKHG and KKWY (Colorado)). After at first reducing KRKY-FM's power to 850 watts, in 2019, Michael raised it to 23,000 watts on a new frequency, 88.1 MHz.

Translators

References

External links
 

RKY-FM
Radio stations established in 2011
2011 establishments in Wyoming